Farkhad Kharki (born 20 April 1991) is a Kazakhstani Olympic weightlifter. He represented his country at the 2016 Summer Olympics where he won a bronze medal in the –62 kg event.

Kharki was suspended for 2 years from July 2013 after testing positive for metenolone in a doping test.

References 

1991 births
Living people
Kazakhstani male weightlifters
Weightlifters at the 2016 Summer Olympics
Olympic weightlifters of Kazakhstan
Olympic bronze medalists for Kazakhstan
Medalists at the 2016 Summer Olympics
Olympic medalists in weightlifting
Doping cases in weightlifting
Kazakhstani sportspeople in doping cases
21st-century Kazakhstani people